List of New Horizons topics is a list of topics related to the New Horizons spacecraft, an unmanned space probe launched 2006 to Pluto and beyond.

New Horizons passed the Moon's orbit in just nine hours.

132524 APL, Distant observation target
15810 Arawn (1994 JR1), Distant observation target
2011 HM102, Neptune Trojan considered as an observation target
2011 KW48, distant observation target 
2014 MT69, former candidate for New Horizons flyby.
2014 OS393, former potential flyby target 
2014 PN70, former potential flyby target 
486958 Arrokoth, flyby on New Year's Day 2019
Alice (spacecraft instrument), one of seven major instruments on New Horizons
Alice Bowman, New Horizons staff
AJ-60A, solid rocket booster of which five were used in the New Horizons launch.
Atlas V, New Horizons launch vehicle 
Cape Canaveral Air Force Station Space Launch Complex 41, launch site
Centaur (rocket stage), New Horizons upper stage
Charon (moon), Pluto's big moon
Common Core Booster, part of New Horizons first stage launcher
Clyde Tombaugh, discovered Pluto in 1930 from Lowell Observatory
Kirk (crater)
Kuiper belt, region from about 30-60 AU New Horizons explores
Lisa Hardaway, New Horizons staff
Long Range Reconnaissance Imager,  one of seven major instruments on New Horizons
GPHS-RTG, electrical and thermal heat source of New Horizons
Interplanetary dust cloud
Interplanetary medium, studied during Hibernation
Mongoose-V, CPU in New Horizons 
NASA Deep Space Network, for New Horizons Earth radio communications
Nasreddin (crater)
New Frontiers program, NASA parent program of New Horizons
New Horizons 2, design study for twin
Organa (crater)
Pluto, primary target of New Horizons
Pluto Energetic Particle Spectrometer Science Investigation, one of seven major instruments on New Horizons
Ralph, one of seven major instruments on New Horizons 
REX, one of seven major instruments on New Horizons
Daniel Sarokon, NASA employee honored at New Horizons launch
Star 48B, New Horizons 3rd stage
Alan Stern, New Horizons staff
SWAP,  one of seven major instruments on New Horizons
Tvashtar Paterae
Vader (crater), crater observed by New Horizons
Venetia Burney Student Dust Counter,  one of seven major instruments on New Horizons
Venetia Burney, New Horizons instrument honorific, Burney proposed Pluto's name in 1930

See also
Exploration of Pluto
List of artificial objects leaving the Solar System
List of trans-Neptunian objects

References

New Horizons